Log-concave may refer to:

 Logarithmically concave function
 Logarithmically concave measure
 Logarithmically concave sequence